Jarron Cumberland (born September 22, 1997) is an American professional basketball player who last played for the Delaware Blue Coats of the NBA G League. He played college basketball for the Cincinnati Bearcats.

High school career
Cumberland attended Wilmington High School in Wilmington, Ohio. He committed to playing college basketball for Cincinnati over offers from Michigan, Florida State, Xavier and others.

College career
As a freshman, Cumberland came off the bench, averaging 19.1 minutes, 8.3 points and 2.4 rebounds per game, earning a place on the American Athletic Conference (AAC) all-freshman team and he shared Sixth Man of the Year honors with Ben Emelogu of SMU. As a sophomore, Cumberland moved into the starting lineup, averaging 11.5 points, 4 rebounds and 2.9 assists per game as the Bearcats went 31–5, earning a 2 seed in the 2018 NCAA tournament. The team’s Final Four hopes were cut short with a second-round loss to Nevada.

After losing stars Gary Clark, Jacob Evans and Kyle Washington for the 2018–19 season, junior Cumberland moved into the primary scoring role for the Bearcats. Cumberland averaged 18.8 points, 4.4 rebounds and 3.6 assists per game. At the conclusion of the season, Cumberland was named AAC Player of the Year.

Cumberland suffered a foot injury in the preseason. Three games into his senior season, Cumberland was benched for one game by new coach John Brannen. Cumberland's ill-advised halfcourt shot contributed to a one-point loss to Colgate on December 14, 2019. In January 2020, Cumberland scored 22 points in a win at Temple, including 14 of the last 16 points. At the conclusion of the regular season. Cumberland was named to the First Team All-AAC. Cumberland averaged 15.5 points and 4.9 assists per game as a senior. He finished his career seventh in school history in both points (1,782) and assists (415).

Professional career

Rio Grande Valley Vipers (2021)
Cumberland was selected 12th overall in the 2021 NBA G League draft by the Rio Grande Valley Vipers. He made his debut in their season opener on February 10, 2021.

Raptors 905 (2021)
On February 26, 2021, Cumberland was traded to the Raptors 905 in exchange for center Dewan Hernandez.

Portland Trail Blazers / Delaware Blue Coats (2021–2022)
On October 2, 2021, Cumberland was traded to the Delaware Blue Coats. He was named MVP of the G League Winter Showcase, after posting 24 points, eight rebounds and six assists in the 104–98 championship game victory against the Oklahoma City Blue.

On December 25, 2021, Cumberland signed a 10-day contract with the Portland Trail Blazers. Cumberland appeared in three games, scoring two points and collecting three rebounds during his stint. On January 5, 2022, following the expiration of his 10-day deal, Cumberland was reacquired by the Delaware Blue Coats of the NBA G League.

Career statistics

NBA

|-
| style="text-align:left;"| 
| style="text-align:left;"| Portland
| 3 || 0 || 4.0 || .500 || .000 || — || 1.0 || .3 || .0 || .0 || .7
|- class="sortbottom"
| style="text-align:center;" colspan="2"| Career
| 3 || 0 || 4.0 || .500 || .000 || — || 1.0 || .3 || .0 || .0 || .7

College

|-
| style="text-align:left;"| 2016–17
| style="text-align:left;"| Cincinnati
| 35 || 0 || 19.1 || .493 || .355 || .644 || 2.4 || 1.5 || 1.0 || .3 || 8.3
|-
| style="text-align:left;"| 2017–18
| style="text-align:left;"| Cincinnati
| 36 || 36 || 28.9 || .409 || .339 || .678 || 4.0 || 2.9 || 1.0 || .4 || 11.5
|-
| style="text-align:left;"| 2018–19
| style="text-align:left;"| Cincinnati
| 35 || 35 || 32.5 || .404 || .388 || .773 || 4.4 || 3.6 || 1.1 || .4 || 18.8
|-
| style="text-align:left;"| 2019–20
| style="text-align:left;"| Cincinnati
| 27 || 27 || 32.4 || .384 || .313 || .753 || 3.8 || 4.9 || 1.0 || .7 || 15.5
|- class="sortbottom"
| style="text-align:center;" colspan="2"| Career
| 133 || 98 || 28.0 || .414 || .352 || .730 || 3.6 || 3.1 || 1.0 || .4 || 13.4

Personal life
In May 2022, Cumberland was charged with a misdemeanor in Hamilton County, Ohio for allegedly punching, kicking and dragging his girlfriend by her hair.

References

External links
Cincinnati Bearcats bio
College stats @ basketball-reference.com

1997 births
Living people
American expatriate basketball people in Canada
American men's basketball players
Basketball players from Ohio
Cincinnati Bearcats men's basketball players
Delaware Blue Coats players
People from Wilmington, Ohio
Portland Trail Blazers players
Raptors 905 players
Rio Grande Valley Vipers players
Shooting guards
Undrafted National Basketball Association players